This is current list of Iranian provincial "Ostandar"  Governor-general in the cabinet of Ebrahim Raisi.

List 
Legend

References

External links

 
Governor-Generals
Iran
Iran, Governor-Generals